Love Is Easy may refer to:

"Love Is Easy" (Badfinger song), 1974
"Love Is Easy" (McFly song), 2012